Malcolm Stewart (born October 27, 1992) is an American professional motocross racer competing in the AMA Supercross and Motocross championships since 2011.

Personal life
He is the younger brother of James "Bubba" Stewart, a former champion in both supercross and motocross.

Career
Stewart made his professional debut on February 12, 2011 at the Houston Supercross held in the Reliant Stadium. For the 2011 Season, he rode for team ARMA-Suzuki City-Nitro Circus in the 9250) Lites Eastern Region riding the number 139 Suzuki.

For the 2012 Season, Stewart moved to the JDR J-Star KTM for the Lites Eastern Region and changed the bike number to 37.

For the 2013, Season after an unsuccessful finish for the Eastern Region, Stewart moved to the 250cc West and changed the bike number to 32. Stewart was signed to Troy Lee Designs Honda to compete in the lites class for 2013 and 2014.

Stewart signed with Geico to contest the 2014 and 2015 supercross seasons. For 2014 he raced the 450 motocross class. He started the season well with top 10s in 9 of the first 11 rounds but missed the last 5 due to complications of dehydration leading to kidney problems. When Stewart's contract expired at the end of 2014 he purchased a Troy Lee Designs factory 450 to use to compete in the Redbull Straight Rhythm in the open class. He did not race the 2015 outdoor motocross because his 2015 deal with GEICO Honda was only for supercross.

In 2016, he won the East Coast 250 Supercross Championship with two race wins and six podium finishes.

Stewart sat out the 2016 Lucas Oil Pro Motocross Championship event in order to prepare for the 2017 racing season.

For the 2017 Monster Energy Supercross season, he partnered with RIDE365.com, an online retailer for motorcycle parts and accessories. For the season, he raced with a Suzuki RM-Z450.

In 2018 Malcolm Stewart was signed as a fill-in rider at team Joe Gibbs racing Suzuki after race 2 of the 450 supercross championship racing bike number 27.

At the 2019 Glendale Supercross, Stewart broke his femur bone while going over the whoop section of the track.

2020 Stewart rode for the BullFrog/Smart Top/Moto Concepts Racing Honda team.

2021 Stewart switched to the Monster Energy Star Racing Yamaha team. He recently became a Go-Pro sponsored rider. He also has another new outside sponsorship from Abu Garcia Fishing equipment. Later in the year, after the 2021 AMA Motocross season concluded, Stewart would sign with Rockstar Energy Husqvarna.

2022 Stewart is riding for Rockstar Husqvarna and is training with Aldon Baker.

References 

Living people
American motocross riders
Sportspeople from Florida
1992 births